"Sound of the Underground" is the debut single of British-Irish pop group Girls Aloud, later featured on their debut album of the same name. The song was written by Miranda Cooper, Brian Higgins, and Niara Scarlett, and produced by Higgins and his production team Xenomania. Following Girls Aloud's formation on the ITV1 reality television show Popstars: The Rivals, "Sound of the Underground" was released 16 days later, on 16 December 2002. Commercially, the song was an immediate success. It became the year's Christmas number one in the UK, spending four consecutive weeks atop of the charts in total. The song also reached number one in Ireland and peaked within the top forty in Australia, Belgium, the Netherlands, Sweden and Switzerland.

The music video was recorded in an empty London warehouse days after Girls Aloud were formed. The song has been performed by Girls Aloud in a number of live appearances including Popstars: The Rivals and each of Girls Aloud's concert tours. Critically appreciated for its juxtaposition of surf guitar against electronic beats, "Sound of the Underground" was praised for its quality for both a girl group and a reality television act. The song was referred to as a defining moment of the decade musically, credited with reshaping British pop for the 2000s.

Background and composition
"Sound of the Underground" was written by Brian Higgins, Niara Scarlett and Miranda Cooper. In an interview with The Daily Telegraphs Alice Vincent, Cooper explained that she was into drum and bass at the time and had been inspired by Puretone's 1998 single "Addicted to Bass". The song has been described as "a mechanistic sashay of twangy surf guitar and sultry gang vocals – Girls Aloud explodes like a five-headed Kylie Minogue." The song is written in E minor (recorded in E-flat minor) with a time signature in common time and a tempo of 163 beats per minute. The vocal range spans from G3 to C#5. Following typical verse-chorus form, the song consists of a verse followed by a bridge and chorus. The second half of the bridge is also employed as a middle 8.

"Sound of the Underground" was one of sixty songs that Higgins and Cooper had written with the aim of launching their own girl group. The song was originally recorded in 2001 by Orchid, a London girl group that included singer and actress Louise Griffiths and who disbanded before gaining a firm record deal. Irish artist Samantha Mumba was due to record this as her comeback song in 2002 but she opted for "I'm Right Here" instead. It was chosen by Girls Aloud's manager Louis Walsh as their debut single. The finalists of the ITV1 programme Popstars: The Rivals recorded and rehearsed the song a week before the finals.

Release
Girls Aloud were formed through the show by a public vote on 30 November 2002. The concept of the programme was to produce a boyband and a girlband who would be "rivals" and compete for the Christmas number one single in 2002. Girls Aloud competed against One True Voice, managed by music producer Pete Waterman. Both groups were sent on huge promotional tour. They used a combative "Buy girls, bye boys" slogan to persuade the public to buy their single. A cover of One True Voice's single "Sacred Trust" appears on the special edition bonus disc of Girls Aloud's greatest hits album The Sound of Girls Aloud, alongside an extended performance version of "Sound of the Underground" which includes an instrumental breakdown.

The single was released on two different CD single formats and on cassette. The first CD included a cover of East 17's "Stay Another Day" and Brian Higgins' remix of "Sound of the Underground", while the second CD included the instrumental of "Stay Another Day" and an interview with the girls. In some countries, a Flip & Fill remix of the single was featured.

Controversy
Pete Waterman caused a media frenzy after accusing Girls Aloud of being unoriginal and not singing on "Sound of the Underground" (after they claimed it was better to release a new song than a cover as the A-side). Many articles falsely claim that this track was then "stolen" from Orchid by Girls Aloud. The track was actually owned by Xenomania (the producers) and the original version was used as a "session singers" version, making it Girls Aloud's and not a cover as some articles suggested. Due to the press attention, the members of Orchid are credited on the single release and remain backing singers on the single. Sarah Harding explained that this just pads out the track and is not uncommon in the industry.

Reception

Critical response
"Sound of the Underground" received a positive response from most music critics. It "proved a first: it was a reality pop record that didn't make you want to do physical harm to everyone involved in its manufacture." A review for Girls Aloud's debut album stated that the song has "become a pulsating pop classic with a modern, metallic beat, catchy chorus and just the right amount of sleaze." The song was further described as "an enticing blend of spiky guitars and Fatboy Slim beats topped off with an irresistibly catchy chorus." Michael Osborn said that "Sound of the Underground" offers "a fresh tune that has no intentions of following the road to seasonal schmaltzville." An article from The Guardian called the song "an icy confection very different from the normal run of girl-band things."

"Sound of the Underground" and another Xenomania production, Sugababes' "Round Round", have been called "two huge groundbreaking hits", credited with reshaping British pop music for the 2000s. Peter Robinson wrote, "Instead of what would become the predictable 'victory lap' ballad, here was an upbeat attitude-soaked celebration of life, partying, and being young." In 2003, "Sound of the Underground" was voted Best Single at the Disney Channel Kids Awards. The Telegraph placed the song at number 15 on a list of 100 songs that defined the 2000s, while NME included it at number 39. Spinner.com named "Sound of the Underground" the eighth best British song of the 2000s.

Chart performance
"Sound of the Underground" debuted at number one on the UK Singles Chart on 22 December 2002. Girls Aloud sold just over 213,000 copies, while One True Voice's "Sacred Trust" sold only 147,000. Girls Aloud stayed at number one for a second and third week, the final chart of 2002 and the first chart of 2003. The single spent another week at number one, bringing "Sound of the Underground" to a total of four consecutive weeks at number one in the UK. It spent two weeks in the top five at numbers three and five respectively, before slipping to number nine. The single spent fourteen further weeks inside the UK's top 75. It was certified platinum by the British Phonographic Industry in March 2003 for shipments of over 600,000 and sold over 653,000 copies. In December 2015, the Official Charts Company stated that "Sound of the Underground" had a chart sales tally of 679,770. In August 2017, the Official Charts Company updated the single's total sales figures to approximately 715,000. Following Sarah Harding's death in September 2021, the song had a resurgence in popularity with sales rising over 125%.

The song had similar success on the Irish Singles Chart. "Sound of the Underground" debuted at number two behind Eminem's "Lose Yourself", while One True Voice only managed to chart at number nine. They held on at number two for a second and thirdweek. In the song's fourth week on the Irish chart, "Sound of the Underground" managed to rise to number one, finally dethroning Eminem. It spent two weeks at the pole position. The song peaked inside the top twenty on Belgium's Ultratop Flanders chart and the Netherlands' Single Top 100 chart. The song also charted in Australia and various European countries.

Music video
The video for "Sound of the Underground" was shot in an empty London warehouse, the Dimco Buildings, just days after Girls Aloud's formation in the last week of competition of Popstars: The Rivals. It was directed by Phil Griffin, who would later direct the videos for "No Good Advice" and "Life Got Cold".

It features the band members in various scenes "underground". In the group scene, they perform the song backed by a band in a large metal enclosure. As the song progresses, each band member also incorporates a tall microphone stand into the choreography, echoed in many live performances in the song. In the solo scenes, each member is shown sitting or standing in the "underground" setting while various other shots, such as a light bulb spontaneously cracking open and catching on fire, are shown.

The music video is available on the "No Good Advice" DVD single, Girls on Film, Style and 2012's Ten: The Videos.

Live performances
Girls Aloud performed "Sound of the Underground" live for the first time on Popstars: The Rivals on 7 December 2002, wearing coordinating pink-and-black outfits as seen on the single's music video. Small puffs of smoke were sent up into the air each time the song reached its chorus. In order to promote the single, the group performed the single at various locations across the country, including a signing at an HMV store in Manchester's Trafford Centre. They also made many television appearances, performing on programmes such as CD:UK, GMTV, Popworld, RI:SE, Richard and Judy, Smile, This Morning, Top of the Pops Saturday, and UK Top 40: CBBC Viewers' Vote. They performed on Popstars again on 22 December, just moments after finding out their single was the Christmas number one. Wearing all-white outfits, the performance included lights and smoke as well as adlibs referencing the number one. They also sang "Sound of the Underground" on the Top of the Pops Christmas special, which airs annually on Christmas Day.

The song was performed on shows like Tops of the Pop and The Saturday Show during 2003. It was also performed at a number of live events in 2003, such as Ireland's ChildLine Concert, Spring Break, Pepsi Silver Clef, Party in the Park, Live & Loud, and the West Belfast Festival. Girls Aloud began to promote the song's release across continental Europe, which involved appearances at Belgium's TMF Awards and on Germany's VIVA Interaktiv and the German version of Top of the Pops. In the United Kingdom, Girls Aloud performed "Sound of the Underground" at the 2003 Disney Channel Kids Awards (where it was named Best Single), the Children in Need telethon, and once again at 2003's Top of the Pops Christmas special. Girls Aloud returned to Ireland's ChildLine in 2004. It was also performed for the group's MTV special, as seen on their DVD Girls on Film.

Since its release, "Sound of the Underground" has been included on each of Girls Aloud's tours. The track was included as the encore to their 2005 tour What Will the Neighbours Say...? Tour. The performance included a dance break and ended with an explosion of pyrotechnics. For 2006's Chemistry Tour, the song was accompanied by new choreography involving chairs, while 2007's The Greatest Hits Tour saw the group in black-and-white variations on a suit. The song was slightly remixed for 2008's Tangled Up Tour, during which Girls Aloud performed it in the first section alongside male dancers. "Sound of the Underground" was also included on 2009's Out of Control Tour; flames burst out of the stage as the group sang and danced. The song was again included on the band's 2013 reunion tour, Ten: The Hits Tour. It was performed as the opening song as the band came down onto the stage on a huge sign reading the band's name.

The single has also been performed at Girls Aloud's appearances at V Festival in 2006 and 2008, as well as their two nights supporting Coldplay at Wembley Stadium. It was showcased during Girls Aloud's 2007 appearance on The Album Chart Show, where they performed songs from their greatest hits album. They also performed it on their one-off variety show The Girls Aloud Party. The group was accompanied by Kaiser Chiefs, who led into "Sound of the Underground" with their own track "Never Miss a Beat".

Track listings and formats
These are the formats and track listings of major single releases of "Sound of the Underground".

UK CD1 / Australia / New Zealand (Polydor / 0658272)
 "Sound of the Underground" – 3:41
 "Stay Another Day" (Tony Mortimer, Rob Kean, Dominic Hawken) – 4:24
 "Sound of the Underground" (Brian Higgins Remix) – 4:40
UK CD2 (Polydor / 0658202)
 "Sound of the Underground" – 3:41
 "Stay Another Day" (Instrumental) – 4:24
 "Girls Aloud Interview" – 7:13
UK Cassette (Polydor / 0658274)
 "Sound of the Underground" – 3:41
 "Stay Another Day" – 4:24
Germany (Polydor / 0654325)
 "Sound of the Underground" – 3:41
 "Stay Another Day" – 4:24
 "Sound of the Underground" (Brian Higgins Remix) – 4:40
 "Sound of the Underground" (Flip & Fill Remix) – 5:36
 "Girls Aloud Interview" – 7:13

The Singles Boxset (CD1)
 "Sound of the Underground" – 3:41
 "Stay Another Day" – 4:24
 "Sound of the Underground" (Brian Higgins Remix) – 4:40
 "Stay Another Day" (Instrumental) – 4:24
 "Girls Aloud Interview" – 7:13
 "Sound of the Underground" (Flip & Fill Remix) – 5:36
 "Sound of the Underground" (Instrumental Breakdown Mix) – 3:36

Credits and personnel
 Guitars: Shawn Lee, Nick Cracknell
 Mastering: Dick Beetham for 360 Mastering
 Mixing and additional production: Jeremy Wheatley for 365 Artists
 Production: Brian Higgins, Xenomania
 Programming and keyboards: Nick Coler, Matt Gray, Tim "Rolf" Larcombe, Tim Powell
 Songwriting: Miranda Cooper, Brian Higgins, Niara Scarlett
 Vocals: Girls Aloud
 Published by Warner/Chappell Music and Xenomania Music
 Special thanks to Eve Bicker, Giselle Sommerville, and Louise Griffiths.

Charts

Weekly charts

Year-end charts

Decade-end charts

All-time charts

Certifications

Release history

References

2002 debut singles
2002 songs
Christmas number-one singles in the United Kingdom
Girls Aloud songs
Irish Singles Chart number-one singles
Number-one singles in Scotland
UK Singles Chart number-one singles
Polydor Records singles
Song recordings produced by Xenomania
Songs written by Brian Higgins (producer)
Songs written by Miranda Cooper
Songs written by Niara Scarlett